The Chinese Ambassador to Ethiopia is the official representative of the People's Republic of China to Ethiopia.

List of representatives

See also
China–Ethiopia relations

References 

Ambassadors of China to Ethiopia
Ethiopia
China